Charlotte Eliot Warburton (1883–1961) was a notable New Zealand community leader and matron. She was born in Palmerston North, Manawatu/Horowhenua, New Zealand in 1883.

References

1883 births
1961 deaths
People from Palmerston North
New Zealand Members of the Order of the British Empire